The Big Apple is a nickname for New York City, New York, United States.

Big Apple may also refer to:

 Big Apple (TV series), a short-lived cop drama TV series on CBS
 Big Apple (dance), a swing/jazz-era dance
 "The Big Apple", a 1937 song about the dance, recorded by Tommy Dorsey with Edythe Wright
 "Big Apple" (song), a 1983 single by the British New Wave band Kajagoogoo
 Big Apple Circus, a circus located in New York City, New York, United States
 Big Apple Comix, an early independent comic book
 Big Apple (Colborne, Ontario), a roadside attraction in Colborne, Ontario, Canada
 Big Apple Township, Oregon County, Missouri
 Big Apple (Amtrak train), a train operated by Amtrak, now merged into Keystone Service
 Central of Georgia "Big Apple", a nickname for train engines on the Central of Georgia Railway
 "Big Apple Rappin'", a 1980 rap single by Spyder-D
 Iso Omena (literally "Big Apple"), a shopping centre in Matinkylä, Espoo, Finland

See also 
 
 Little Apple (disambiguation)